The Pellaifa Lake is one of the "Seven Lakes" in Panguipulli municipality, southern Chile. The lake is of glacial origin and lies in an area of hot springs.

References

Lakes of Los Ríos Region
Lakes of Chile
Glacial lakes of Chile